George T. Knight (October 29, 1850 – 1911) was an American Universalist teacher at the Crane Theological School, a Universalist seminary at Tufts University.

Works
 Article on Universalists in the Schaff-Herzog Encyclopedia of Religious Knowledge

References

External links
 

1850 births
1911 deaths
Members of the Universalist Church of America
People from Windham, Maine
Contributors to the Schaff–Herzog Encyclopedia of Religious Knowledge
19th-century Christian universalists
20th-century Christian universalists
Tufts University faculty